Gold mining is a major industry in the U.S. State of Nevada. In 2020 mining overall contributed $9.5 billion to the state's economy, $8.4 billion from gold and silver mining (all silver produced in Nevada is as a by-product from gold mining). Gold production from Nevada was higher than any other U.S. state,  in 2020 (a decrease of 4.8% on 2019), accounting for 76% of gold produced in the United States and 4.5% of the world's production. The United States ranks fourth, behind China, Australia and Russia. The Nevada mining industry supported an average 15,136 direct employees in 2020, with about 75,000 additional jobs related to providing goods and services needed by the mining industry.

The following is a list of active gold mines in Nevada.


List of active gold mines

See also
 Gold mining in Nevada
 Nevada Gold Mines

Notes

  Carlin consists of three open pits and four underground mines: Gold Quarry, Emigrant/Rain, Chukar, Exodus, Pete Bajo & Leeville.
  Rochester also produced 3.17 million oz of silver.
  Includes Pipeline and South Pipeline open pits and Cortez Hills open pit and underground mines.
  Includes Betze-Post open-pit mine, and Meikle and Rodeo underground mines.
  Includes SSX-Steer, Smith and Starvation Canyon underground mines.
  Phoenix also produced 42.0 million pounds of copper.
  Robinson also produced 110 million pounds of copper.
  Includes Getchell and Turquoise Ridge underground mines.
  Pumpkin Hollow also produced 2.67 million pounds of copper.

References

Nevada
Lists of gold mines